Oswald Snip (born 9 August 1971 in Zaandam, Netherlands) is a Dutch footballer who played for Eerste Divisie clubs HFC Haarlem during the 1995–1996 season, FC Den Bosch during the 1996–1999 seasons, TOP Oss during the 1999–2000 season and VVV-Venlo during the 2000–2002 seasons.

References

External links
voetbal international profile

1971 births
Living people
Dutch footballers
HFC Haarlem players
FC Den Bosch players
TOP Oss players
VVV-Venlo players
Eerste Divisie players
Footballers from Zaanstad
Association footballers not categorized by position